Sulakshan Kashinath Kulkarni (born 15 January 1967) is a former Indian first-class cricketer who played for various teams, mainly Mumbai cricket team, from 1985/86 to 2001/02. He became a cricket coach after retirement.

Playing career
Kulkarni was a wicket-keeper who batted right-handed. He batted at various positions in his career including opening, and played as a specialist batsman in several matches. He made his debut for Railways cricket team at the age of 18, but switched to Bombay cricket team in the following season. He is best known for his 459-run opening partnership with Wasim Jaffer in 1996/97 against Saurashtra cricket team, Mumbai's highest partnership for any wicket. He was dismissed for his personal best score of 239, while Jaffer went on to score an unbeaten triple-hundred. He played for five different Ranji teams, but 46 of his 65 first-class appearances were for Mumbai. Kulkarni announced his retirement in February 2000 at the age of 33. He then played one season for Madhya Pradesh in 2001/02.

Coaching career 

Kulkarni coached Mumbai under-19s for three years before working as Vidarbha cricket team's head coach for two seasons ending 2010/11. After a successful stint with Vidarbha, he was selected to coach Central Zone cricket team. He became head coach of Mumbai cricket team in 2011/12 and coached the team for three seasons. During his tenure the team ended as semifinalists in the 2011–12 Ranji Trophy and emerged champions of the 2012–13 Ranji Trophy.

He has appointed as batting coach of Nepal Cricket team in 2018 for one month. In 2019, he was appointed as the Head Coach for Physically Challenged Cricket World Cup for Team India which emerged as Winners in its first historical win.

References

External links 
 
 

1967 births
Living people
Indian cricketers
Mumbai cricketers
Railways cricketers
Assam cricketers
Vidarbha cricketers
Madhya Pradesh cricketers
West Zone cricketers
Indian cricket coaches
People from Uttara Kannada
Cricketers from Karnataka